Philibert I (17 August 1465, Chambéry – 22 September 1482), surnamed the Hunter, was the son of Amadeus IX, Duke of Savoy and Yolande of Valois. Philibert was Duke of Savoy from 1472 to 1482.

After his father's death in 1472, his mother became regent. Philibert was betrothed to Bianca Maria Sforza, daughter of Galeazzo Maria Sforza of Milan, by his second wife, Bona of Savoy, in 1474. They had no children.

Initially kidnapped by Savoyard noblemen and held at Turin, the intervention of Louis XI of France led to Philibert's release. He died from tuberculosis, in Lyons, at the age of 17 and the duchy was inherited by his younger brother Charles.

Notes

References

Sources

1465 births
1482 deaths
15th-century Dukes of Savoy
15th-century deaths from tuberculosis
People from Chambéry
Italian people of Cypriot descent
Medieval child monarchs
Burials at Hautecombe Abbey
Tuberculosis deaths in France